Baltimore East/South Clifton Park Historic District is a national historic district in Baltimore, Maryland, United States. It is primarily an urban residential area organized in a gridiron pattern.  It comprises approximately 110 whole and partial blocks that formed the historic northeast corner of the City of Baltimore prior to 1888. While rowhouses dominate the urban area, the historic district also contains other property types which contribute to its character including brewing, meat packing, cigar manufacturing, printing, and a tobacco warehouse. The Baltimore Cemetery completes the historic district.

It was added to the National Register of Historic Places in 2002.

History
Between the 1890s and the 1910s, many new homes were constructed in the neighborhood for Bohemian immigrants. Areas with Bohemian owners included the 1500 block of North Durham Street, 1700 block of Crystal Street, 1700 block of North Register Street, 1100 and 1500 blocks of North Bradford Street, and 1700 and 1800 blocks of North Chapel Street. Czech-American building and loans associations helped Bohemians purchase these homes. Many of the Bohemians attended mass at St. Wenceslaus, a Bohemian Roman Catholic parish in the nearby neighborhood of Little Bohemia. During the 1950s, the area of the neighborhood surrounding North Milton Avenue and North Luzerne Avenue was primarily Polish, German, and Irish.

See also
Clifton Park, Baltimore

References

External links
, including photo from 2002, at Maryland Historical Trust
Boundary Map of the Baltimore East/South Clifton Park Historic District, Baltimore City, at Maryland Historical Trust

Czech-American culture in Baltimore
East Baltimore
German-American culture in Baltimore
Historic districts on the National Register of Historic Places in Baltimore
Irish-American culture in Baltimore
Italianate architecture in Maryland
Polish-American culture in Baltimore
Romanesque Revival architecture in Maryland
Tobacco buildings in the United States